Tiên Yên is a district of Quảng Ninh province in the northeastern region of Vietnam. As of 2003 the district had a population of 43,227. The district covers an area of 617 km². The district capital lies at Tiên Yên.

Administrative divisions
Tiên Yên, Đại Dực, Hà Lâu, Phong Dụ, Điền Xá, Yên Than, Hải Lạng, Tiên Lãng, Đông Ngũ, Đông Hải, Đồng Rui.

References

Districts of Quảng Ninh province